A by-election was held in the Dáil Éireann Dublin South-West constituency in Ireland on Friday, 10 October 2014, following the election of Fine Gael Teachta Dála (TD) Brian Hayes to the European Parliament.

The Electoral (Amendment) Act 2011 stipulates that a by-election in Ireland must be held within six months of a vacancy occurring. The Roscommon–South Leitrim by-election was held on the same date.

Paul Murphy of the Anti-Austerity Alliance was elected on the eighth count. Murphy's victory came as a surprise as Sinn Féin had performed extremely well in local elections the previous May, winning 50.3% of the first preference vote in the Tallaght South LEA and 32% in the Tallaght Central LEA, and were widely predicted to win the seat. Murphy largely campaigned on the issue of Irish Water, stating that Sinn Féin could not be trusted to oppose water charges. In the wake of a poor local election result, Labour and Fine Gael were not considered contenders for the seat while Fianna Fáil largely focused its resources on the Roscommon–South Leitrim by-election.

Murphy's victory brought the issue of water charges to the forefront of political debate in the run-up to the 2016 general election, and contributed to a shift in Sinn Féin's position to one of outright opposition.

Result

See also
2014 Roscommon–South Leitrim by-election
List of Dáil by-elections
Dáil constituencies

References

Dublin South-West by-election
2014 in Irish politics
31st Dáil
By-elections in the Republic of Ireland
Elections in South Dublin (county)
By-elections in County Dublin
October 2014 events in Ireland